Hosking is a surname of Cornish origin. In Cornwall there are also the variant forms Hosken, Hoskin and Hoskins. Unlike many Cornish surnames which are associated with a small district, Hosking and its variants are distributed in west Cornwall (Hosking and Hosken), mid Cornwall (Hoskins) and east Cornwall (Hoskin). It has the meaning "sedgeman", i.e. a thatcher who makes roofs of sedge.

Notable people with the surname include:
Barbara Hosking (broadcaster), British civil servant and broadcaster
Bill Hosking, Australian rules footballer who played with Geelong in the Victorian Football League (VFL)
Charles Ernest Hosking, Jr. (1924–1967), Medal of Honor recipient
Eric Hosking OBE (1909–1991), English photographer noted for his bird photography
Geoffrey Hosking (born 1942), historian of Russia and the Soviet Union
George Hosking OBE, Quaker, economist, accountant, psychologist and clinical criminologist
Henry Alfred Hosking (1908–1957), Liberal Party member of the Canadian House of Commons
Janine Hosking, Australian documentary film maker
Jeremy Hosking, British businessman noted for interests in railway heritage
John Hosking (politician), Australian politician and first elected mayor of Sydney
Mike Hosking, New Zealand television and radio journalist and presenter
Rita Hosking, American composer and musician based in Davis, California
Sampson Hosking, Australian rules footballer who played with and coached Port Adelaide in the SAFL
Stuart Hosking (born 1965), British TV personality
William Hosking FSA (1800–1861), writer, lecturer, and architect; influenced the development of London in Victorian times

See also
Arthur Hoskings (1872–1919), American and Australian cricketer

Footnotes